Greendale is a suburb of Sydney, in the state of New South Wales, Australia.

History
Greendale was originally home to the Mulgoa tribe of the Darug people. The first British explorer to visit the area was botanist George Caley in 1800. A number of land grants were made in the area in 1811, one of which was to a Mary Birch who named her property Greendale. Another 1811 grant was made to Ellis Bent who was the colony's judge-advocate. Bents Basin, a recreational area on the Nepean River at Greendale is named after him.

The land was mainly used for wheat farming until 1861 when wheat rust infected the entire crop. The local farmers tried other crops unsuccessfully and gradually moved to other pastoral areas, effectively killing off the town that had grown up in the area. By 1929, the bakery, post office, school and churches had all closed down. A bushfire in 1939 destroyed virtually all the buildings left in the town. Today, even though the suburb has a population of a few hundred, there is no town centre.

References

Suburbs of Sydney
City of Liverpool (New South Wales)